Tomice  is a village in the administrative district of Gmina Gizałki, within Pleszew County, Greater Poland Voivodeship, in west-central Poland.
Village located on the  Wielkopolska Lowland. In the west border of the town shall appoint a river Prosna, on the north and east boundary shall designate the forests located on poor soils, podzolic.
In Tomice their habitat has a very large group of animals such as:  European beaver boar and deer woodpeckers  martens forest and deer.

The forests are rich in berries and mushrooms.

Developed industrial agro-food trade, and industry Kotlarski and wood and above all agriculture. (The ratio of forests to agricultural land is about 1 / 2).

In Tomice headquarters are: the primary school. Defenders of Tobruk, the house of culture and the volunteer fire brigade. Within the house of culture operates a branch library, municipal and country club.

The village operates a bakery that supplies bread and pastries dozen surrounding towns.

Once in the village run two mills (water and wind), and two blacksmiths.

In Tomice There is also a Car mechanic.

Within the village (in agricultural areas near Prosna) planned to build a wind farm (18 turbines).

There are plans to build a sports hall and football ground was built on synthetic grass surfaces for school.

History 

Tomice lie on the Amber Trail, which ran along the Prosna. The first settlers lived in the area Tomic already present in the early years of the sixteenth century. Town was called from the frequent flooding Toplice which brought together Prosna river. It was only later adopted the present name, thanks to the landowner (probably) Thomas Tomicki, who was distinguished by his goodness and righteousness. At one time a large proportion of the population Tomic was the Jewish population. Under the decision of the Congress of Vienna was a city in 1815 within the Russian Empire, where he remained until World War I, was then the frontier town. Thus, in the years 1918-1939 was in the limits of the Second Republic. Although the town was in the Russian zone is the proximity of the Prussian partition resulted in a high culture of farming.

The village has an approximate population of 586.

References

Tomice